Gregory Coleman (1949–2005) was an American guitarist and educator.

Gregory Coleman may also refer to:
Gregory C. Coleman (1944–2006), American drummer
Greg Coleman (born 1954), American football player
Greg Coleman (jurist), American lawyer